Lucy Ann Polk (May 16, 1927 – October 10, 2011) was an American jazz singer who performed with Les Brown's orchestra in the 1950s.

She also sang and recorded with Bob Crosby, Kay Kyser, Tommy Dorsey, and Dave Pell.

Career
Polk began her music career with her sister and brothers in a quartet named the Four Polks, which was eventually changed to the Town Criers. They performed with big bands led by Les Brown, Lionel Hampton, and Kay Kyser until they disbanded in 1948. Polk became the lead vocalist with the Les Brown Orchestra. From 1952–1954, she was named Best Girl Singer with Band by Down Beat magazine.

She began her solo career with the album Lucy Ann Polk with the Dave Pell Octet (Trend, 1954), followed by Lucky Lucy Ann (Mode, 1957; reissued by Interlude under the name Easy Livin in 1959). The latter album featured arrangements by Marty Paich. On both albums, she sang jazz and traditional pop songs by Duke Ellington, Billy Strayhorn, Hoagy Carmichael, Cole Porter, Sammy Cahn, Jule Styne, and Jimmy Van Heusen. She released no more albums and ended her career in 1960.

Personal life
In 1946, Polk married Dick Noel, who played trombone with Les Brown's orchestra.

Discography
 With the Dave Pell Octet (Trend, 1954)
 The Dave Pell Octet Plays Burke & Van Heusen (Kapp, 1956)
 Lucky Lucy Ann (Mode, 1957)
 With the Les Brown Orchestra 1950–1953 (Olfert Dappers, 1997)
 Imagination (SSJ, 2013)

Notes

External links
 Audio of Lucy Ann Polk on The Les Brown Show

1927 births
2011 deaths
American jazz singers
American women jazz singers
Big band singers
People from Sandpoint, Idaho
Singers from Idaho
21st-century American women